Linkville may refer to:

 Linkville, Indiana, an unincorporated community
 Linkville, Kansas City, a neighborhood of Kansas City